Le Mérévillois is a commune in the department of Essonne.

It was established on 1 January 2019 from the amalgamation of the communes of Méréville and Estouches.

Geography

Climate

Le Mérévillois has a oceanic climate (Köppen climate classification Cfb).

References

Communes of Essonne
Communes nouvelles of Essonne
Populated places established in 2019
2019 establishments in France